Council Rudolph, Jr. (born January 18, 1950) is a former professional American football player.

Career
Rudolph played defensive end for six seasons for the Houston Oilers, the St. Louis Cardinals, and the Tampa Bay Buccaneers. Council attended Kentucky State University, where he is in the Hall of Fame. Council was also inducted into the Calhoun County Sports Hall of Fame in 2009.

After football
In 1982, Rudolph opened The Check Casher, the first check cashing business in Tampa, Florida.

References

1950 births
Living people
American football defensive ends
Kentucky State Thorobreds football players
Houston Oilers players
St. Louis Cardinals (football) players
Tampa Bay Buccaneers players
Sportspeople from Anniston, Alabama
Players of American football from Alabama